Aklavik was a small cargo vessel the Hudson's Bay Company used to carry supplies to, and furs from, its outposts in the high Arctic. She was active in the first half of the 20th century.

Construction

Aklavik was built in Vancouver, then shipped, by rail, to Fort McMurray, then the northernmost terminus of the North American railgrid. Until the railgrid was extended to the riverport of Hay River, on Great Slave Lake, every vessel operating on, or transiting, the Mackenzie River, was shipped to Fort McMurray, then proceeded to a portage around the extensive rapids on the Slave River, near Fort Smith. Aklavik was towed from Fort McMurray to the portage, without any engines. Used engines were installed after she transited the portage.

Aklavik was registered in Winnipeg.

Operational history
She was frozen in, over-winter, in Bernard Harbour, in 1930, resulting in her sinking, but she was refloated.

Some sources report that Aklavik was actually the second vessel to traverse the Northwest Passage, in 1937, under the command of Scotty Gall, not the Royal Canadian Mounted Police (RCMP) schooner .

According to the Hudson's Bay Company, however, since, after transiting the Bellot Strait, to Baffin Bay, she rendezvoused with a larger ship in the Company's fleet, transferred some cargo, and then turned around, stopping short of a full traverse of the passage.
Later in 1942, the ship was sold, for $1, to Patsy Klengenberg, son of Christian Klengenberg, for him to resupply trading posts at King William Island. On 31 August 1946, Klengenberg had anchored the Aklavik at Cambridge Bay. While starting the engine a fire broke out, the ship exploded and Klengenberg was killed.

References

1923 ships
Hudson's Bay Company ships
Schooners
Transport in Nunavut
Water transport in the Northwest Territories